Lars Andersson (born 23 March 1954)  is a Swedish writer.

Andersson made his literary debut in 1974 with the novel Brandlyra. His next novel was Vi lever våra spel (1976), and in 1977 he published the short story collection Gleipner. His novel Snöljus from 1979 has been named as a literary breakthrough. His essay collections include Försöksgrupp from 1980, Skuggbilderna (1995), and Fylgja – Resor och essäer (2004). In 1985, he published the poetry collection Lommen lyfter, and a later poetry collection is Motgift from 2001.

He has been a literary critic for the newspapers Dagens Nyheter, Aftonbladet and Expressen''.

He was awarded the Dobloug Prize in 2020.

References

1954 births
Living people
Swedish poets
Swedish novelists
Swedish essayists
Swedish literary critics
Dobloug Prize winners